William Thomas Webb, MA (5 March 1825 – 6 May 1896) was Archdeacon of Grenada from 1879 until his death.

He was educated at Codrington College; and ordained in 1849. After a curacy at St George, Grenada he was Headmaster of  Codrington Grammar School from 1850 to 1864 when he became Principal of Codrington College.

References

19th-century Anglican priests
Alumni of Codrington College
Archdeacons of Grenada
1825 births
1896 deaths